Viva Cuba is a 2005 Cuban film, directed by Juan Carlos Cremata and Iraida Malberti Cabrera, and written by Cremata and Manolito Rodriguez. It was the first Cuban film to be awarded the ‘Grand Prix Écrans Juniors’ for children's cinema at the 2005 Cannes Film Festival.

In Viva Cuba, a road movie fairy tale, Cremata tackles localized Cuban problems from the literal point of view of the country's children. He lowers the camera to the eye level of the film's protagonists, Malú (Malú Tarrau Broche) and Jorgito (Jorgito Miló Ávila).

Background
Viva Cuba is a Cuban independent film that explores emigration and the effects it can have on children who have to leave friends and extended families behind. Youngsters are often uprooted without being consulted and then must contend with their new surroundings. In one scene, Malú and Jorgito discuss when they might reunite. The best they can hope for is to forget one another as their lives change and they face new pleasures and challenges. The viewer knows they are unlikely to ever see each other again, unless Malú's mother can be granted re-entry, which is extremely unlikely given the state of Cuban immigration laws.

Plot 
Viva Cuba takes place in Cuba and the two main characters are Malú, who comes from a middle-class family and is raised by her single mother, and Jorgito, whose mother is a poor socialist and his father an alcoholic. The film uses the two children from two different backgrounds to show how these children symbolize the people of Cuba and whether or not they can predict the outcomes of the future.

What neither woman recognizes is the immense strength of the bond between Malú and Jorgito. Following the death of Malú's grandmother, the children find out that Malú's mother is planning to leave Cuba to go to another country, where she has a boyfriend, Jorgito suggests they run away and travel to the other side of the island to find Malú's father and persuade him against signing the forms that would allow Malú and her mother to leave the country, followed by him saying that if they were to hug strongly, they would be inseparable, even if Malú were to leave Cuba.

Both children are seen preparing for the journey as their social statuses greatly contrast. Malú's clean clothes and her plastic drinking cup at breakfast and her toys are compared to Jorgito's uncleaned clothes and the use of a metal cup for breakfast. The two children embark on their journey, avoiding the police sent to search for the two of them. The disappearance of both children bring their mothers closer together in their grief.

Jorgito loses the map he brought with him and tensions rise between the two children. Not to mention, Malú sang on stage at a festival that was broadcast over the air. The kids' parents saw Malú on TV and had the implication that Malú and Jorgito were, in fact, traveling towards the lighthouse. Jorgito then becomes infuriated with Malú.

They insult each other; Malú brings up Jorgito's social status, and Jorgito calls Malú's mother a slut. However, they were stuck with each other for the rest of the journey. One day, Malú gets hungry, and the two kids find a tent containing tons of food and goods, although they don't know who it belongs to. The kids fight over who gets to eat what food until the owner of the tent arrives, asking why they were trespassing. Malú explains their story, while she and Jorgito also try to explain that they didn't want to be friends anymore. The owner of the tent tells them that true friends always stay friends, even if they fight, causing Malú and Jorgito's bond to reform.

When they reach the lighthouse where Malú's father works, the forms had already been signed before she could persuade him otherwise. The parents (minus Malú's father), having reached the lighthouse before the kids got there, begin to beat their children and argue among each other. The two children run away from the fight and console each other on a cliff, as a large wave washes over them and the film ends.

Conclusion 
After this tough and long journey the children realize at the end that they cannot stop what is going to happen, just the same that the people of Cuba can fight for a change and it probably will not happen. The children then run off and stand on top of a cliff, they hug, and the water storms on top of them. It can be implied that they jumped off because they were unhappy with the outcome. This symbolizing that the people of Cuba during this time were also still unhappy with the way things were going and that they cannot change them. Another implied ending is that after the children hug they jump off the cliff and commit suicide. The end of the film is unknown to what exactly happened whether the children lived or died, just as the future of Cuba during that time was unknown as to whether things would become better or worse. The children symbolize how people of Cuba were reacting during that time. They were unaware of what exactly from the past will impact their future and just how drastic those changes will be towards the future of Cuba.

Analysis 

Taking place in Cuba, Malú is from a middle-class family and her single mother does not want her to play with Jorgito, as she thinks his background is coarse and common-place. Jorgito's mother, a poor socialist proud of her family's social standing, places similar restrictions on her son. What neither women recognize is the immense strength of the bond between Malú and Jorgito. Following the death of Malú's grandmother, the children find out that Malú's mother is planning to leave Cuba to go to another country, where she has a boyfriend, Jorgito suggests they run away and travel to the other side of the island to find Malú's father and persuade him against signing the forms that would allow Malú and her mother to leave the country, followed by him saying that if they were to hug strongly, they would be inseparable, even if Malú were to leave Cuba.

Both children are seen preparing for the journey as their social statuses are greatly contrasted. Malú's clean clothes and her plastic drinking cup at breakfast and her toys are compared to Jorgito's uncleaned clothes and the use of a metal cup for breakfast. The two children embark on their journey, avoiding the police sent to search for the two of them. The disappearing of both children bring their two mothers closer together in their grief. 

Jorgito loses the map he brought with him and tensions rise between the two children. Not to mention, Malú sung on stage at a festival that was broadcast over the air. The kids' parents saw Malú on TV and had the implication that Malú and Jorgito were, in fact, traveling towards the lighthouse. Jorgito then becomes infuriated with Malú.

They insult each other; Malú brings up Jorgito's social status, and Jorgito calls Malú's mother a slut. However, they were stuck with each other for the rest of the journey. One day, Malú gets hungry, and the two kids find a tent containing tons of food and goods, although they don't know who it belongs to. The kids fight over who gets to eat what food until the owner of the tent arrives asking why they were trespassing. Malú explains their story, while she and Jorgito also try to explain that they didn't want to be friends anymore. The owner of the tent tells them that true friends always stay friends, even if they fight, causing Malú and Jorgito's bond to reform.

When they reach the lighthouse where Malú's father works, the forms had already been signed before she could persuade him otherwise. The parents (minus Malú's father), having reached the lighthouse before the kids got there, begin to beat their children and argue among each other. The two children run away from the fight and console each other by the shore; a silent goodbye. Malú and Jorgito head down a cliff where they are in front of wide ocean as they strongly hug, proving Jorgito's words of their friendship being eternal. It is implied that the two children jump off of the cliff, committing suicide, although this is not shown in the movie. It is also arguable that the children have been fantasizing the entire time and the final scene does not actually indicate their corporeal deaths, but the death of their cherished friendship.

The films starts out with a few smaller boys who are playing with fake guns. Later on Malú states that she wants to be the queen of Spain, the children are pretending that they are in the Spanish War, Cuba against Spain. Since the children are playing this as a game, it is interpreted that they do not fully understand the meaning of war and why they exist or what the outcomes are after a war. During the film the parents express how they do not know what Cuba will have for them in the future. 

When Malú's grandmother dies, Malú overhears her mother on the phone talking to her future husband about leaving Cuba because now that her mother has died there is nothing left for them there. Malú does not want to leave so her and Jorgito take matters into their own hands. As many of the people in Cuba did for their own reasons. Already the film is showing how the children have no say in anything their parents are planning to do, as the people in Cuba have no say in what the future of Cuba holds for them. For the children it is hard when a parent tells them they are going to leave their home, but for some people in Cuba during this time they felt like they had to leave to stay safe. For Malú she had just lost her grandmother and now her mother was telling her that she was going to have to leave all of her friends too. The children do not exactly understand why they cannot change her mother's mind so they go in search of her father. For the people of Cuba they cannot understand how someone can dictate them the way that they are being treated. When the children finally reach Malú's father he has already signed the papers and Malú is devastated. She cries and says how could he sign the papers when no one asked her if she even wanted to leave. 

All of these actions represent the past and the present of what is happening in Cuba. Malú and Jorgito's hope is a representation of how the people of Cuba hope their futures will be. It is easily compared to how the two feel about Malú having to leave. Both of the children are hopeful that they can get her father to not sign the papers, just as the people of Cuba are hopeful that Cuba will become a better place. The children are on a journey to get Malú's dad to fix the situation, just as the people of Cuba are hopeful and looking for other people to fix the situations that they are currently in. Malú and Jorgito are fighting for something, that is in comparison to, what the people of Cuba are fighting for.

Reception 
The film became a box office hit and went on to win many awards nationally and internationally as it was displayed at many film festivals around the world, including 2005 Cannes Film Festival,  where it won the Grand Prix Ecrans Juniors Award, plus awards in countries as diverse as Australia, Italy, Guatemala, Germany, France, and Taiwan. In 2008, it was shown all over Venezuela.  The film was screened at the Sonoma County Cuban Film Festival in Sebastopol, CA, in July 2015.

Awards
Viva Cuba won 34 national and international awards in all, including:
 Grand Prix Ecrans Juniors, Cannes, 2005
 Best Film award at the International Children Cinema and Television Festival in Taiwan.
 Special Mention, Cinecircoli Giovanili Socioculturale.  Giffoni International Film Festival, Italia, 2005.
 Premio en las categorías de dirección, guión, dirección de fotografía y edición. Premio Caracol. UNEAC, 2005.
 Premio especial otorgado por la Unión de Pioneros José Martí. UNEAC, 2005.
 Premio de ayuda à la distribución. XIII Festival de Cine de españa y América Latina. Bélgica, 2005.
 Premio à la Mejor Edición. VIII Festival de Cine Infantil. Guayana, Venezuela, 2005.
 Premio à la Mejor Película. VIII Festival de Cine Infantil. Guayana, Venezuela, 2005.
 Reconocimiento Especial de la Agencia Internacional de Noticias Prensa Latina. 27 Festival Internacional del Nuevo Cine Latinoamericano. La Habana, Cuba, 2005.
 Premio del Oyente de la Emisora radio Progreso. 27 Festival Internacional del Nuevo Cine Latinoamericano. La Habana, Cuba, 2005.

References

External links

 
 Viva Cuba Excerpts

2005 films
2000s children's films
Cuban comedy-drama films
2000s Spanish-language films
Films set in Havana